The name Aranguren may make reference to

Places
 Aranguren, town in Spain
 Aranguren, Argentina, municipality in Argentina

People
 Eulogio Aranguren, Argentine soccer player
 Francisco Gárate Aranguren, Spanish jesuit
 Gonzalo Parra-Aranguren, Venezuelan judge at The Hague
 Jesús Aranguren, Spanish soccer player
 José Aranguren, Spanish general
 José Julián de Aranguren, Spanish archbishop
 Juan-Martín Aranguren, Argentine tennis player
 Juan José Aranguren, Argentine minister of energy
 Sotero Aranguren, Argentine soccer player
 José Luis López Aranguren, Spanish philosopher